Sean Ryder (born 18 June 1987) is a British water polo player.

Born in Nottingham, Ryder has been playing water polo since he was 14.  He has competed for Rapid Bucharest, SV Weiden and the Great Britain National Team. In 2012 he was selected to represent Great Britain in the 2012 London Olympics, the first British Olympic water polo team since 1956.

References

External links

1987 births
English male water polo players
Living people
Sportspeople from Nottingham
Olympic water polo players of Great Britain
Water polo players at the 2012 Summer Olympics